Vanc may refer to:

 Andreea Ehritt-Vanc (born 1973), Polish tennis player
 D-alanine—D-serine ligase, an enzyme
 Vancomycin, an antibiotic
 Vertical Ancillary Data Space